Canney is a surname. Some notable persons with the surname include:

Don Canney (1930–2011), American politician and civil engineer 
Marian Canney (1921–2019), American academic
Richard Canney (1852–1887), English-born cricketer and doctor in New Zealand and Australia
Seán Canney (born 1960), Irish politician

Surnames